Pansol is an urban barangay in Calamba, Laguna, Philippines. It is located at the southeast edge of the city. The barangay is situated at the foot of Mount Makiling near the city's border with Los Baños and is known for its hot springs.

Economy

The resorts industry of Pansol contributes significantly to the barangay's economy and has been known as a tourist destination for its resorts since the 1970s. As of October 2009, there are about 700 resorts in Pansol.

Geography
Pansol is subdivided into seven puroks numbered I to VII. It is surrounded by five other barangays.

Population

Education 
Pansol is the site of at least two elementary schools namely E. Baretto Sr. Elementary School and Perpetual Help Elementary School as well as a senior high school, the E. Baretto National High School.

References

Barangays of Calamba, Laguna
Spa towns in the Philippines